Casual Viewin' is a 2000 album by Canadian alternative rock band 54-40.  The title refers to a lyric from the Genesis song "Broadway Melody of 1974", which reads: "Marshall McLuhan, casual viewin', head buried in the sand." 54-40 commented in interviews at the time of the album's release that they were influenced by McLuhan's work when making the album, and that they adopted the Genesis lyric as a result.

Track listing
 "Casual Viewin'" – 4:43
 "Unbend" – 3:49
 "Blue Sky" – 4:05
 "Sunday Girl" – 4:39
 "Roll Up Rule" – 4:23
 "She's a Jones" – 4:24
 "It's Alright" – 3:45
 "Watching You" – 4:44
 "Say My Name" – 4:40
 "Speak What You Feel" – 5:10
 "Someone's Mind" – 3:28
 "You the One" – 4:22
 "Big You Up" – 3:57
 "Castles" – 3:54

Additional Personnel

Production
 Howard Redekopp - Engineer

2000 albums
54-40 albums